Candis Angelene (born July 21, 1975) is a South African singer. Her debut album Ancient Light reached number 4 on the Classic FM (South Africa) chart.

Discography
In 2009, Angelene launched her debut album Ancient Light.  The album received rave reviews.  The April 2010 of the South African Oprah Magazine said "With its calm and soothing spirit, this album will be welcome respite after a long day"

Ancient Light
Released: 2009Number of Discs: 1

Track listing
 Anthem of Courage
 This is our Secret
 Love of Our Own
 For Eternity (Per l’Eternita’)
 When all we have is Love
 Running Free
 They’re Shining for You
 My Brother
 The Lord’s my Shepherd
 Coming Home

References

External links
Official Site of Candis Angelene
Launch of Ancient Light on Classic FM
Candis Angelene profile page on 5 seasons music

21st-century South African women singers
Living people
1975 births